Eric Robinson (born June 14, 1995) is an American professional ice hockey winger currently playing for the  Columbus Blue Jackets of the National Hockey League (NHL).

Playing career
Raised in Bellmawr, New Jersey, Robinson played prep hockey at Gloucester Catholic High School, graduating in 2013.

Robinson was selected by the United States Hockey League (USHL)'s Dubuque Fighting Saints in the third round, 44th overall, in the 2013 USHL Entry Draft after his final Midget year. He played the 2013–14 season in the USHL before playing collegiate hockey with Princeton University of the ECAC conference.

Robinson's development improved each year with the Tigers ice hockey team, increasing his points totals and role within the team. In his senior season in 2017–18, Robinson was selected as team captain. He recorded a career-high 17 goals and 31 points in 36 games while helping Princeton surprise everyone in winning the ECAC playoff tournament and being crowned 2017–18 champions, also earning a trip to the NCAA tournament.

Having been unselected in any NHL Entry Draft, Robinson attracted considerable NHL interest as a free agent and signed a two-year, entry-level contract with the Columbus Blue Jackets on March 27, 2018. With the intention to immediately burn a year off his contract, Robinson was added to the Blue Jackets' roster and made his NHL debut in the final game of the 2017–18 regular season, a 4–2 defeat to the Nashville Predators on April 7, 2018.

In the 2019–20 season, on November 12, 2019, Robinson scored his first NHL career goal with the Blue Jackets against Carey Price and the Montreal Canadiens.

3 seasons later in the 2022-23 NHL season, Robinson scored his first career hat trick on February 28th, 2023 against Craig Anderson and the Buffalo Sabres.

Personal
Robinson's brother, Buddy, is also a professional ice hockey player under contract with the Chicago Blackhawks, who had previously played with the Ottawa Senators, Calgary Flames and Anaheim Ducks in the NHL.

Career statistics

Regular season and playoffs

International

Awards and honors

References

External links

1995 births
Living people
American men's ice hockey left wingers
Cleveland Monsters players
Columbus Blue Jackets players
Dubuque Fighting Saints players
Gloucester Catholic High School alumni
Princeton Tigers men's ice hockey players
Undrafted National Hockey League players
People from Bellmawr, New Jersey
Sportspeople from Camden County, New Jersey
Ice hockey players from New Jersey